William LaVar Evans (born December 31, 1948) is a college basketball head coach, currently the head coach at USU Eastern.

Career
Prior to USU Eastern, he was the head coach for Idaho State University and at his alma mater Southern Utah University.

Head coaching record

College

Junior college

References

1948 births
Living people
Alaska Anchorage Seawolves men's basketball coaches
American men's basketball coaches
Basketball coaches from California
College men's basketball head coaches in the United States
High school basketball coaches in the United States
Idaho State Bengals men's basketball coaches
Montana Grizzlies basketball coaches
People from San Mateo, California
Southern Utah Thunderbirds men's basketball coaches
Southern Utah University alumni